The Charles Drayton House is a historic Victorian home at 25 East Battery, Charleston, South Carolina. It was completed in 1886 for Charles H. Drayton (1847-1915), having been designed by W.B.W. Howe, Jr.

The location of the house was the former site of the Greek Revival home of Daniel Heyward, which had been destroyed in the Civil War. The ruins were removed for the construction of the new house. The house, built with white brick and black grout, was designed with elements of Queen Anne architecture, Chinese influences and Eastlake detailing.

References

Houses in Charleston, South Carolina